Victor Pavlovich Protopopov (October 22, 1880, Poltava Governorate – 1957, Kiev) was a famous Ukrainian Soviet psychiatrist and, member of the USSR Academy of Sciences. Being a pupil of Vladimir Bekhterev, Protopopov founded his own pathophysiological school of thought in the Soviet psychiatry. Victor Pavlovich Protopopov authored more than 110 articles.

He is also known for the "Protopopov's syndrome", or "Protopopov's triad", which consists of the tachycardia, dilatated pupils and obstipation in bipolar disorder (then known as manic-depressive psychosis).

See also
 Vladimir Bekhterev

External links
http://www.whonamedit.com/doctor.cfm/2247.html

1880 births
1957 deaths
Russian psychiatrists
Ukrainian psychiatrists
Bipolar disorder researchers
S.M. Kirov Military Medical Academy alumni
Academic staff of Perm State University